The islands of Cape Verde were uninhabited when discovered and claimed by Portugal in 1456. A Portuguese colony was established in 1462. The islands were united as a single crown colony in 1587. In 1951, the islands became an overseas province of Portugal. Autonomy was granted in 1974 and independence was granted on 5 July 1975.

List
(Dates in italics indicate de facto continuation of office)

Santiago
(later northern Santiago)

Ribeira Grande
(southern Santiago)

Boa Vista

Alcatrazes Islands

Praia

Fogo

Sal, Santa Luzia and Brava

Santo Antão

The Islands of Cape Verde

For continuation after independence, see: List of presidents of Cape Verde

See also
 Cape Verde
 Politics of Cape Verde
 List of presidents of Cape Verde
 List of prime ministers of Cape Verde
 Lists of office-holders

External links
 World Statesmen – Cabo Verde (Cape Verde)

Cape Verde Colonial Governors
List
Cape Verde
Cape Verdean history timelines